Christopher Smith (born 1 July 1972) is a British film director and screenwriter. His four most prominent pieces of work are Creep, Severance, Triangle and Black Death.

Filmography
Short film

Feature film

Television

References

External links

Interview with Christopher Smith on the making of Black Death – February 2011
Interview with Christopher Smith at Future Movies

British film directors
Living people
English screenwriters
English male screenwriters
English film directors
Horror film directors
1972 births